Škorpil (feminine Škorpilová) is a Czech surname. Notable people with the surname include:

Hermenegild Škorpil, Czech archaeologist
Karel Škorpil, Czech archaeologist
Ladislav Škorpil, Czech football manager

Czech-language surnames